The 1988 All-Big Ten Conference football team consists of American football players chosen as All-Big Ten Conference players for the 1988 NCAA Division I-A football season.  The 1988 Michigan Wolverines football team captured seven of the first-team spots on the All-Big Ten teams selected by the conference coaches for the United Press International. The Iowa Hawkeyes followed with six first-team spots, including quarterback Chuck Hartlieb.

Offensive selections

Quarterbacks
 Chuck Hartlieb, Iowa (AP-1; UPI-1)
 Jeff George, Illinois (AP-2)
 Dave Schnell, Indiana (UPI-2)

Running backs
 Anthony Thompson, Indiana (AP-1; UPI-1)
 Tony Boles, Michigan (AP-1; UPI-1)
 Keith Jones, Illinois (AP-2; UPI-2)
 Blake Ezor, Michigan State (AP-2; UPI-2)

Centers
 John Vitale, Michigan (AP-1; UPI-1)
 Jeff Uhlenhake, Ohio State (AP-2; UPI-2)

Guards
 Don Shrader, Indiana (AP-1; UPI-1)
 Mike Husar, Michigan (AP-1; UPI-1)
 Bob Kula, Michigan State (AP-2; UPI-2)
 Tim Radtke, Indiana (AP-2; UPI-2)

Tackles
 Tony Mandarich, Michigan State (AP-1; UPI-1)
 Bob Kratch, Iowa (AP-1; UPI-1)
 Mark McGowan, Illinois (AP-2; UPI-2)
 Kevin Robbins, Michigan State (AP-2)

Tight ends
 Marv Cook, Iowa (AP-1; UPI-1)
 Tim Jorden, Indiana (AP-2)
 Jeffrey Brown, Michigan (UPI-2)

Receivers
 Andre Rison, Michigan State (AP-1; UPI-1)
 Deven Harberts, Iowa (AP-1)
 John Kolesar, Michigan (UPI-1)
 Greg McMurtry, Michigan (AP-2; UPI-2)
 Steven Williams, Illinois (AP-2; UPI-2)

Defensive selections

Linemen
 Morris Gardner, Illinois (AP-1; UPI-1)
 Dave Haight, Iowa (AP-1; UPI-1)
 Mark Messner, Michigan (AP-1; UPI-1)
 Joe Mott, Iowa (AP-1; UPI-1)
 Joe Huff, Indiana (AP-1; UPI-2)
 Travis Davis, Michigan State (AP-2; UPI-2)
 Kurt Larson, Michigan State (AP-2; UPI-2)
 Mel Agee, Illinois (AP-2; UPI-2)
 Jeff Koeppel, Iowa (AP-2)
 Jerrol Williams, Purdue (AP-2)

Linebackers
 Brad Quast, Iowa (AP-1; UPI-1)
 Percy Snow, Michigan State (AP-1; UPI-1)
 Darrick Brownlow, Illinois (AP-1; UPI-2)
 Willie Bates, Indiana (AP-2; UPI-1)
 J. J. Grant, Michigan (AP-2; UPI-2)
 Darrin Trieb, Purdue (AP-2; UPI-2)

Defensive backs
 Marc Foster, Purdue (AP-1; UPI-1)
 John Miller, Michigan State (AP-1; UPI-1)
 Glenn Cobb, Illinois (AP-1; UPI-1)
 David Arnold, Michigan (AP-2; UPI-1)
 Zack Dumas, Ohio State (AP-2; UPI-2)
 Ronnie Beeks, Purdue (AP-2)
 Marc Ferry, Indiana (UPI-2)
 Marlon Primous, Illinois (UPI-2)
 Derrick Reed, Michigan State (UPI-2)

Special teams

Kickers
 Pete Stoyanovich, Indiana (AP-1; UPI-1)
 Mike Gillette, Michigan (AP-2; UPI-1)
 Pat O'Morrow, Ohio State (UPI-2)

Punters
 Mike Gillette, Michigan (AP-1; UPI-1)
 Ed Sutter, Northwestern (AP-2)
 Brent Herbel, Minnesota (UPI-2)

Key
AP = Associated Press

UPI = United Press International, selected by the Big Ten coaches

Bold = Consensus first-team selection of both the AP and UPI

See also
1988 College Football All-America Team

References

All-Big Ten Conference
All-Big Ten Conference football teams